DaiWai M. Olson (born 1962) is an American nurse.

Olson completed an associate degree in nursing at Scott Community College in 1986, and finished a bachelor's degree in 1997, graduating from Teikyo Marycrest University. He obtained his PhD from the University of North Carolina at Chapel Hill. Olson was a researcher at Duke University from 1994 to 2013, when he started working at the University of Texas Southwestern Medical Center. He became editor-in-chief of the Journal of Neuroscience Nursing in 2016, succeeding V. Susan Carroll. In 2018, he became the first nurse promoted to the rank of professor.

References

External links

1962 births
Living people
Academic journal editors
American nurses
UNC School of Nursing alumni
Duke University staff
People from Iowa
University of Texas Southwestern Medical Center faculty